Narendar Bisth Singh is an Indian Olympic boxer. He represented his country in the featherweight division at the 1992 Summer Olympics. He lost his first bout against Carlos Gerena.

References

1964 births
Living people
Indian male boxers
Olympic boxers of India
Boxers at the 1992 Summer Olympics
Place of birth missing (living people)
Featherweight boxers